Uldis Augulis (born 16 March 1972, in Dobele, Latvian SSR) is a Latvian politician and a member of the Union of Greens and Farmers. He holds a bachelor's degree in financial management from the University of Latvia. He was the former Welfare Minister from 12 March 2009 to 3 November 2010, the Minister of Transport from 3 November 2010 to 25 October 2011 and the acting Minister of Justice from March to April 2010. Augulis was elected to the Saeima on October 2, 2011.

Career timeline 
2008 – 2009 - Parliamentary Secretary of Ministry of Welfare

2007 – 2008 - Parliamentary Secretary of Ministry of Agriculture

2006 – 2008	Member of Parliament (Saeima),

2000 – 2006	Chairman of Berze Rural Municipality

Since 1996 	Owner of the Farm “Auguļi”,

1990 – 1996	 Co-owner of the Farm “Īves”

Other positions held:
2003 – 2006	Chairman of the Council, Dobele City Bus Fleet, Ltd.

2000 – 2006  	Chairman of the Board, Dobele Department of Political Party Latvian Farmer's Union

2001 – 2006	Member of the Council, Latvian Association of Local and Regional Governments

2003 – 2006	Member of the EU Committee of the Regions

2005 – 2006	Chairman of the Advisory Council, State Agency K.Ulmanis Memorial Museum Pikšas.

Controversy
Augulis caused controversy with his prioritisation of road and rail links between Riga and Moscow while delaying regional EU projects such as Rail Baltica citing a lack of funds.

Latvia has already lost EUR 12.2 million (LVL 8.54 million) of EU funds due to hesitation over the Rail Baltica project, and the EU Transport Commissioner has stated there is no chance that the EU will contribute funds to the proposed Moscow link despite Augulis' assertion that the EU could contribute up to 85%.

The high-speed railroad project between Riga and Moscow is economically justified due to increasing passenger and cargo turnover, and it is not political, Russian Transport Minister Igor Levitin said after a meeting with Augulis.

References

1972 births
Living people
People from Dobele
Latvian Farmers' Union politicians
Ministers of Welfare of Latvia
Transport ministers of Latvia
Deputies of the 9th Saeima
Deputies of the 10th Saeima
Deputies of the 11th Saeima
Deputies of the 12th Saeima
Deputies of the 13th Saeima
Deputies of the 14th Saeima
University of Latvia alumni